The mayor of Lewisham is a directly elected mayor responsible for the executive function of Lewisham London Borough Council in London, England. Steve Bullock held the position from 2002 until May 2018, when he was succeeded by Damien Egan.

Referendum

Elections

2002

2006

2010

2014

2018

2022

References

Lewisham